H. E. Stratford was an Australian cricketer who played for Victoria.

Stratford made a single first-class appearance for the team, during the 1853–54 season, against Tasmania. From the tailend, he scored 2 not out in the first innings in which he batted, and a duck in the second.

References

External links
H. E. Stratford at Cricket Archive

Australian cricketers
Victoria cricketers
Melbourne Cricket Club cricketers
Year of death missing
Year of birth missing